Muttina Haara is a 1990 Indian Kannada-language war-drama film directed by Rajendra Singh Babu. It stars Vishnuvardhan and Suhasini Maniratnam in the lead roles. K. S. Ashwath, Kavya and Ramkumar feature in supporting roles. The film speaks of the toll of warfare on a soldier's family. A portion of the core plot of the film is partially based on Ernest Hemingway's novel, A Farewell to Arms.

Plot 
Achchappa, serving as a jawan in the British Indian Army, is injured while the World war II is raging. He is tended to by a nurse, Lieutenant Annapurna. She also hails from the same region in Karnataka as he, Coorg. They fall in love with each other and get married after the end of the war. Achchappa returns to work leaving Annapurna, who has now quit her job, with her in-laws; father-in-law Belliappa has retired as a havaldar. Annapurna gives birth to a son, Veeraraju, but childbirth complications lead to her uterus being removed to save her life, leaving her unable to bear another child.

In 1952, Achchappa stationed in Korea, is transferred to India's Rajasthan. Having been away from home for a few years now, he longs to see his young son. His wife and son travel to meet him in Rajasthan's desert, where he currently stationed. An airstrike by the enemy takes Veeraraju's life before Achchappa gets to see him. Achchappa and Annapurna are aggrieved; Annapurna rejoins the army as a nurse. Despite her insistence, Achchappa refuses to remarry for the sake of having another child. They remain faithful to each other as years pass by. They also ensure that their parents back home are not made known about their son's death.

Achchappa, now a Major, trains young cadets in the Indian Military Academy, Dehradun. Not having met him and his family for over ten years, his aged parents come over to see them. A guilt-ridden Annapurna reveals to them about their son's death and Achchappa's unwell mother dies from the shock. Meanwhile, another war has broken out and Achchappa is sent to India's snow-covered border region with his troop. His troop and he are captured by the enemy and taken to their territory, and are tortured to reveal a certain military secret. However, Achchappa refuses to give in and endures the pain inflicted. In his troop is a young and promising soldier, Naik Mohan, who Achappa treats as his son. The two manage to escape into India's territory but are mortally wounded. Achappa dies there while his protégé dies in the army hospital, before revealing to Annapurna, now a Major, about the former's death. Achchappa is given a state funeral back home, while Annapurna loses her sanity.

Cast 
 Vishnuvardhan as Achchappa
 Suhasini Maniratnam as Annapurna
 K. S. Ashwath as Belliappa
 Ramkumar as Naik Mohan
 Kavya
 Master Anand as Veeraraju
 Prakash Raj
 Sihi Kahi Chandru
 Sadashiva Brahmavar
 Mukhyamantri Chandru

Theme
The title, meaning a string of pearls, stands for what Achappa promises his wife; every year he buys a pearl and gives it to her with the hope that one day she can make a necklace of it. She does get her pearl necklace complete only to have it broken at Achappa's funeral. The movie depicts how war affects a soldier's life and his family. The film opens with a scene where Hitler is shown giving a speech. The backdrop is the Second World War (1939-45) in which Achappa the soldier is abroad fighting. When his young son becomes a casualty in another war (in 1947, against invading Pakistan) the mother buries him in the sand dunes while vultures hover overhead. While the soldier and his wife pass by the same spot the mother runs to uncover the corpse but Achappa stops her, hence the father never gets to see his son. The film ends with the funeral of the soldier at the time of the India-China War (1962) and his wife becoming insane. Skeletons riding horseback through the darkness are shown at the start and the end of the movie. This is a metaphor for the ravages of war. The movie is not just a family saga but it depicts a larger dimension, the devastating effects of war. Imperialists start the war for their own greed but ultimately it is the people who suffer. Director Rajendra Singh Babu has conveyed a strong message - stop the war.

Soundtrack

Hamsalekha composed the music for the film and the soundtracks, also writing the lyrics for all the soundtracks. The album has five soundtracks.

Awards and recognition 
38th National Film Awards
 Best Feature Film in Kannada — Rajendra Singh Babu

1990–91 Karnataka State Film Awards
 First Best Film — Rajendra Singh Babu
 Best Supporting Actor — K. S. Ashwath
 Best Cinematographer — D. V. Rajaram

38th Filmfare Awards South
 Best Actress – Kannada — Suhasini Maniratnam

1991 International Film Festival of India
 Screened in mainstream section

References

External links
 

1990s Kannada-language films
Indian war drama films
1990 films
Films scored by Hamsalekha
Films directed by Rajendra Singh Babu
Best Kannada Feature Film National Film Award winners
1990s war drama films
1990 drama films